Hexi is a town of Guide County, in the east of Hainan Tibetan Autonomous Prefecture in eastern Qinghai province, China. In the 2020 National Census it had a population of 19,408, making it the second largest town of Guide.

References 

Township-level divisions of Qinghai
Guide County